Edacheri is a small panchayath in the district of Kozhikode in the South Indian state of Kerala.

Location
It is part of the North Malabar province of Kerala, and is situated east of Vatakara. Purameri Panchayat borders it to the east, Eramala Panjayath to the west and Mahe river to the north.

Administration

Edacheri comes in the Nadapuram constituency and has a strong leftist political history. The panchayat has always gone to the LDF (Left Democratic Front) since its inception.

Demographics
The panchayat has a mixed population. Hindus constitute the majority. There is a large Muslim 
population also.

Economy
There is a strong agrarian sector, and the crops are mainly coconuts, areca nuts and pepper. Paddy cultivation has a major setback now, as is the case with most of Kerala, with paddy fields being claimed for houses and for more profitable crops.  There are no major industries in Edacheri and migration to the Middle East (Gulf) and to the major cities in India is prevalent.  There is a Saliya-theruvu where weaving is an important occupation. There are granite quarries in the Panchayat where granite mining is carried out.

Educational institutions
There are many primary, many upper primary schools, and one Higher secondary school in the panchayat, including Narikkunnu UP School, Thalayi LP school, Kacheri UP school, Edacheri North UP School, Puthiyangadi Mappila LP School, Edacheri Central LP school, Thuruthi LP school, Iringannor Higher secondary school, etc.  But for higher education, students have to go to Government College, Madappally, Mokeri Gvt college, College of Applied Science, NadapuramVatakara town, Purameri or Orkkatteri (neighbouring villages).

Community 
The majority of the people here are Hindus belonging to the Thiyya or other lower castes of the Hindus. Nevertheless, a significant portion of Edacheri is also constituted by Nambudiri, Mappila, and Thiyya.

Political Issues
Edacheri is part of nadapuram region. Nadapuram has a history of street violence between Muslim league(IUML) and CommunistsCPI(M). In one such incident, a number of Congress supporters had their hand chopped by the Communists.
On 24 January 2015, one communist volunteer called P.Shibin was murdered.  The police issued prohibitory orders in violent areas like Nadapuram, Valayam, Kuttiady and Edachery. The communist volunteers retaliated by torching the houses of the accused persons.
On 11 April 2001, Muslim League activists attacked Chekkiad village near Nadapuram with daggers, choppers, pickaxes and sickles.  Three communist workers were seriously injured.
The police are not effective in this area because the number of security personnel deployed is only ten percent of the perpetrators of the violence.

Places of worship
The Kaliyam Velli Devi's temple (temple of Saraswati and other deities) is a major temple in the area. Kaliyam velli temple is under malabar devaswom board administration. There is a Kavu (woods) belonging to the temple, which is rich with folklores.  This is a beautiful example of Kerala temple architecture. The theyyam, an integral part of Kerala village life, can be seen at the yearly 'Kakkannoor Thira'. 'Kakkannoor Thira'Festival is on 31 January, 1 and 2 February of every year.  The kakkannoor thira mahotsavam (theyyam) is very famous.  The siva kshethra temple is located to alisseri(alisseri shiva Subramanian temple), Poyanneri Bhagavathi Temple is located in Edacheri North. koyambatta devi kshetram and chundayil sree mahaganapathi temple also located in edachery, sree Thuruthi Kottayil kiratha moorthi temple also located in Thuruthi An Also locating for Edachery

Kettungal Juma'at Palli is one of the oldest Masjid in this Village.  In addition to this Nelloor Palli, Puthan Palli, Puthiyangadi Palli, Kommili Palli and Thalayi Palli, Kacheri palli are the major masjids of the Village.
There is dargah of Malol kunjabdullah musaliyar located at Kalium Velli. The rifayi uroos celebrating every year is a major celebration, in which thousands of people from different areas from different religions gather at the dargah.
'Vijaya Kalavedhi and Library ' one of the oldest Centre for arts and cultural center in the village.

Political parties office
AKG Center located at Edacheri town is the major office of Maxist Party. League House located at Puthiyangadi and Thalayi are the Party Center of Indian Union Muslim League.CPI office located at top of panchayath shopping complex. 
Marxist party's Political Jadha's and Conference are major events of the Edacheri towns.

Panchayath

The Panjayath was ruled by LDF from its origin of democratic rule. Most of the time there was no opposition elected for the Panchayath Sabha.
Kaliyamvelli Puzha, a part of Mahe river is the main water source or agriculture in the area.
It is also a main source of fish for the local people. Many local workers after their routine working hours move to the river side to have a catch...for food and for sport for a few.

Transportation
Edachery village connects to other parts of India through Vatakara city on the west and Kuttiady town on the east.  National highway No.66 passes through Vatakara and the northern stretch connects to Mangalore, Goa and Mumbai.  The southern stretch connects to Cochin and Trivandrum.  The eastern Highway going through Kuttiady connects to Mananthavady, Mysore and Bangalore. The nearest airports are at Kannur and Kozhikode.  The nearest railway station is at Vatakara.

The public transportation KSRTC and private bus are mostly depended on for transport. KSRTC bus service to Wayanad from Vadakara is having 2 stops at Edachery and Thalayi.
Private buses to Thrissur, Kozhikkode, Vadakara, Iringannur, Nadapuram, Kuttiadi, Thottilpalam, Valayam, Parakkadavu, and Kakkattil are accessible from Edachery.
There is a limited stop bus stop as well for long route buses.

References

Villages in Kozhikode district
Vatakara area